Dinah Cancer and the Grave Robbers are a renewed version of classic deathrock band, 45 Grave.  After 45 Grave disbanded, frontwoman Dinah Cancer and bandmember Lisa Pifer formed "Dinah Cancer and the Grave Robbers", continuing in the style of 45 Grave.

Band members
Dinah Cancer: Vocals
Daniel De Leon: Guitar/Vocals
Lisa Pifer: Bass/Vocals
Hal Satan: Drums

External links
Official website
Official MySpace

American punk rock groups
American death rock groups